Juan Diego Turcios (born September 22, 1992) is a Salvadoran judoka. He competed at the 2016 Summer Olympics in the men's 81 kg event, in which he was eliminated by Avtandil Tchrikishvili in the third round.

References

External links
 

1992 births
Living people
Salvadoran male judoka
Judoka at the 2016 Summer Olympics
Olympic judoka of El Salvador
Central American Games gold medalists for El Salvador
Central American Games medalists in judo
Judoka at the 2015 Pan American Games
Judoka at the 2019 Pan American Games
Pan American Games competitors for El Salvador